Oleg Zhivotnikov (born April 7, 1967) is a retired Russian professional footballer.

Zhivotnikov played in the Russian Premier League with FC Torpedo Moscow.

Honours
 Dhaka League champion: 1993.
 Dhaka League top scorer: 1993.

External links
Profile at Footballfacts.ru

References

1967 births
Living people
Soviet footballers
Soviet expatriate footballers
Russian footballers
Russian expatriate footballers
Expatriate footballers in Bangladesh
Expatriate footballers in Sweden
Russian Premier League players
Mohammedan SC (Dhaka) players
FC Asmaral Moscow players
FC Torpedo Moscow players
FC Torpedo-2 players
Russian expatriate sportspeople in Bangladesh
IFK Luleå players
Association football forwards